Zuidhorn (abbreviation: Zh) is a railway station located in Zuidhorn in the Netherlands. The station was opened on 1 June 1866 and is located on the Harlingen–Nieuweschans railway between Leeuwarden and Groningen. The train service is operated by Arriva.

Train services

Bus services

References

External links 
 
 Zuidhorn station, station information

1866 establishments in the Netherlands
Railway stations in Groningen (province)
Railway stations on the Staatslijn B
Railway stations opened in 1866
Westerkwartier (municipality)
Railway stations in the Netherlands opened in the 19th century